Edward Rush (29 March 1868 – 6 May 1936) was an Australian cricketer. He played three first-class cricket matches for Victoria between 1897 and 1898. His brother, Thomas, also played for Victoria.

Rush began his cricket career while attending Wesley College and became captain of the College cricket team in 1883. In district cricket he played for the Hawksburn Cricket Club which became Prahran and he was named a life member of the Prahran Cricket Club. 

In his professional career Rush was a grain broker. In his personal life he attended Glendeargrove Methodist Church in Malvern, serving as a trustee of the Church, and he had seven sons.

See also
 List of Victoria first-class cricketers

References

External links
 

1868 births
1936 deaths
Australian cricketers
Victoria cricketers
Cricketers from Melbourne